Goalpokhar Assembly constituency is an assembly constituency in Uttar Dinajpur district in the Indian state of West Bengal.

Overview
As per orders of the Delimitation Commission, No. 30 Goalpokhar Assembly constituency covers Goalpokhar I community development block.

Goalpokhar Assembly constituency is part of No. 5 Raiganj (Lok Sabha constituency).

Members of Legislative Assembly

bolded year = bye

Election results

2021 Election

2016 Election

2011
In the 2011 elections, Md. Ghulam Rabbani of Congress defeated his nearest rival Saifur Rahman of AIFB.

 

.# Swing calculated on Congress and Forward Bloc vote percentages in 2006 and 2011, as adequate data not available for intervening bye-election.

2009 bye election
The bypoll to the Goalpokhar seat was necessitated after sitting MLA of Congress Deepa Dasmunsi resigned. For Elected As MP of Raiganj. As of Results, Ali Imran Ramz of Forward Bloc Defeated Md. Ghulam Rabbani of Congress By almost a Margin of 15,000 Votes.

1977-2009
In the by election in 2009 caused by the election of the sitting MLA, Deepa Dasmunshi of Congress to the Lok Sabha from Raiganj (Lok Sabha constituency), the Goalpokhar assembly seat was won by Ali Imran Ramz of Forward Bloc. Contests in most years were multi cornered but only winners and runners are being mentioned. Deepa Dasmunshi of Congress defeated Hafiz Alam Sairani of Forward Bloc in the 2006 state assembly elections. Hafiz Alam Sairani of Forward Bloc defeated Deepa Dasmunshi of Congress in 2001, and Md Mustafa of Congress in 1996. Md Ramjan Ali of Forward Bloc defeated Nizamuddin Ahamed of Congress in 1991 and 1987, Puranmal Chand Maheswari of BJP/ Independent, in 1982 and 1977.

1957–1972
Sheikh Sharafat Hussain of Congress won in 1972 and 1971. Mohamad Salimuddin of PSP won 1969 and 1967. Mohammad Hayat Ali of PSP won in 1962. Muzzafar Hussain of Congress won in 1957. Prior to that Goalpokhar constituency was not there.

References

Assembly constituencies of West Bengal
Politics of Uttar Dinajpur district